Wadena is a city in Fayette County, Iowa, United States. The population was 209 at the time of the 2020 census.

Wadena's electricity is supplied by Alliant Energy. Its land-line phone and DSL internet service is provided by Windstream. Cellular phone service is mainly provided by U.S. Cellular, as they have a tower located just east of town. Wadena is located in a valley and other cellular phone providers have spotty coverage in town. Wadena no longer has a cable television provider. Any cable television services must be obtained through satellite service providers such as Dish Network or DirecTV.

Wadena is remembered in Iowa for the Woodstock-like rock festival held on a nearby farm, August 1–3, 1970. It also held a second rock-fest in late July 1995, which met with less success and notoriety than the original event.

Wadena is also known for its lighted cross, which is located on the hill south of town. The cross overlooks Wadena and was erected during the bi-centennial celebrations in 1976. The lighted cross is maintained entirely by donations. Further, the Barney Burger is a popular attraction in Wadena.

Wadena is one of the towns that make up the North Fayette Valley School System. In 2013, the Valley Community School District entered a Whole-Grade Sharing Agreement with neighboring North Fayette CSD to become North Fayette Valley. The new mascot is the Tigerhawk, a combination of both schools' former mascots, the Valley Tigers and the North Fayette Hawks. Grades 9-12 are located in West Union at the North Fayette Valley High School. Grades 7-8 are located at the North Fayette Valley Middle School between Elgin and Clermont. Unless open enrolled out, all elementary students in Wadena will attend Valley Elementary, located in the same building as the NFV Middle School.

Geography
Wadena is located at  (42.840464, -91.656473).

Wadena is located along Iowa County Road W51, two miles south of Iowa State Route 56. It is located in Iowa's Driftless Area.

The Volga River is located on the south side of the city.

Demographics

2010 census
As of the census of 2010, there were 262 people, 111 households, and 68 families residing in the city. The racial makeup of the city was 99.2% White and 0.8% from two or more races. Hispanic or Latino of any race were 0.8% of the population.

There were 111 households, of which 30.6% had children under the age of 18 living with them, 48.6% were married couples living together, 8.1% had a female householder with no husband present, 4.5% had a male householder with no wife present, and 38.7% were non-families. 28.8% of all households were made up of individuals, and 15.3% had someone living alone who was 65 years of age or older. The average household size was 2.36 and the average family size was 2.94.

The median age in the city was 37.6 years. 26.7% of residents were under the age of 18; 9.9% were between the ages of 18 and 24; 21% were from 25 to 44; 25.9% were from 45 to 64; and 16.4% were 65 years of age or older. The gender makeup of the city was 49.6% male and 50.4% female.

2000 census
As of the census of 2000, there were 243 people, 111 households, and 71 families residing in the city. The racial makeup of the city was 98.77% White, 0.41% African American, and 0.82% from two or more races.

There were 111 households, out of which 28.8% had children under the age of 18 living with them, 48.6% were married couples living together, 12.6% had a female householder with no husband present, and 36.0% were non-families. 32.4% of all households were made up of individuals, and 13.5% had someone living alone who was 65 years of age or older. The average household size was 2.19 and the average family size was 2.76.

In the city, the population was spread out, with 24.3% under the age of 18, 6.6% from 18 to 24, 23.9% from 25 to 44, 25.5% from 45 to 64, and 19.8% who were 65 years of age or older. The median age was 41 years. For every 100 females, there were 86.9 males. For every 100 females age 18 and over, there were 87.8 males.

The median income for a household in the city was $25,500, and the median income for a family was $31,563. Males had a median income of $32,250 versus $14,688 for females. The per capita income for the city was $13,861. About 7.1% of families and 14.3% of the population were below the poverty line, including 24.7% of those under the age of eighteen and 5.6% of those 65 or over.

Education
Wadena is a part of the North Fayette Valley Community School District. It was previously a part of the Valley Community School District, which merged into the North Fayette Valley district on July 1, 2018.

References

External links
 City of Wadena official website

Cities in Fayette County, Iowa
Cities in Iowa